The Patiala cricket team was a first-class cricket team representing Patiala (Patiala State before 1947) in Indian domestic competitions. The team competed in the Ranji Trophy in the 1948–49, 1955–56, 1957–58 and 1958–59 seasons. They played their home matches at the Baradari Ground (now known as the Dhruve Pandove Stadium) in Patiala.

Patiala played 14 first-class matches, with the first being a two-day match against Marylebone Cricket Club in February 1927 and the last coming in January 1959 against the Railways cricket team in the 1958–59 Ranji Trophy.

See also
 Southern Punjab cricket team
 Eastern Punjab cricket team
 Northern Punjab cricket team

References

External links
Lists of matches played by Patiala

Cricket in Punjab, India
Indian first-class cricket teams
Former senior cricket clubs of India
1898 establishments in India
1959 disestablishments in India
Cricket clubs established in 1898